Najlepších 15 Rockov - Best Of is the first compilation album by the Slovak punk rock band Iné Kafe, released on 17 May 2010.

Track listing

CD 1 - Originals

CD 2 - Unplugged

Personnel

CD 1 - Originals
 Vratko Rohoň - vocals (1-18, 23), guitar (1-24)
 Marek "Cibi" Cibula - vocals (19-22)
 Mário Chromý - vocals, guitar (24)
 Tibor Prikler - guitar (7-15)
 Peter "Forus" Fóra - bass, backing vocals (1-15)
 Mário "Wayo" Praženec - bass (16-24) guitar (1, 2)
 Jozef "Dodo" Praženec - drums (1, 2, 16-24)
 Daniel Mathia - drums (7-15)
 Jáno Rozbora - drums (3-6)
 Bobo "Boboš" Prochádzka - harmonica (3)
 Tomáš Kmeť - hammond (3)

CD 2 - Unplugged 
 Vratko Rohoň - vocals, guitar, backing vocals
 Peter "Forus" Fóra - bass, backing vocals
 Jozef "Dodo" Praženec - drums, percussions
 Mário "Wayo" Praženec - backing vocals

Guest artists
 Svetlana Olahová - violin (6, 7)
 Ján Lešický - violin (6)
 Martin Mierny - viola (6)
 Czaba Rácz - cello (6)
 Miro Tásler - keyboard (1, 4, 6, 7), hammond (4)
 Martin Husovský - keyboard (3)
 Peter "Prelo" Preložník - piano (9, 10)
 Zuzana Smatanová - harmonica (7)
 Stano Kociov - accordion (8)
 Peter Opet - trumpet (1, 8)
 Ľubomír Horák -  trombone (1, 8)
 Peter Huraj - saxophone (1)
 Mário "Gapa" Garbera - saxophone (1)
 Dan Haffar - percussions (5)
 Ivan Tásler - vocals, backing vocals, handclaps (6, 7)
 Inekafe fans - backing vocals (4)

References

2010 compilation albums
Iné Kafe albums